Eno Collaboration is a 1996 EP released in both vinyl and CD formats by the indie band Half Man Half Biscuit. It comprises the following tracks:

 "Eno Collaboration" (4:07)
 "C.A.M.R.A. Man" (3:12)
 "Get Kramer" (3:33)
 "Hair Like Brian May Blues" (3:15)

The songs "Eno Collaboration" (in a different mix) and "C.A.M.R.A. Man" were subsequently included on the 1997 album Voyage to the Bottom of the Road.

The music writer Paul Du Noyer has called Half Man Half Biscuit's song titles 'surreal' and 'addictive', citing "Eno Collaboration" as one example.

Cultural references 
As is common with Half Man Half Biscuit, the songs incorporate numerous cultural references and allusions. Those identified include:
 The EP title, and the title track, refer to the noted music producer Brian Eno. The title track also refers to:
 the Aurora Borealis
 the German national anthem, "Deutschland über alles"
 "C.A.M.R.A Man" mentions:
 science fiction TV series Doctor Who
 motorcycle clothing brand Belstaff
 humorist Willie Rushton
 TV presenter Sally James
 Bonneville motorcycles
 the Five Nations rugby union competition
 rock band Cheap Trick and their album Cheap Trick at Budokan
 "Get Kramer" alludes to, among other things:
 the 1971 film Get Carter
 "Kramer", either Mark Kramer (aka Kramer), musician and producer, or Wayne Kramer, MC5 guitarist
Alan McGee, co-founder of Creation Records
 the musical sub-genre shoegazing
 the 1940 song by Woody Guthrie "This Land Is Your Land"
 the 1969 song by MC5 "Kick Out the Jams" on the album of the same name
 the magus Aleister Crowley (18751947)
 "Hair Like Brian May Blues" utilises the well-known AAB blues structure. The singer laments the fact that having woken up that morning with a hairstyle similar to that of the Queen guitarist, he may have lost the title of hardest man on the estate

References

External links 
 The longest-established Half Man Half Biscuit fan site
 Eno Collaboration at the Half Man Half Biscuit Lyrics Project

1996 EPs
Half Man Half Biscuit albums